The Billboard Hot 100 is a chart that ranks the best-performing singles of the United States. Its data, published by Billboard magazine and compiled by Nielsen SoundScan, is based collectively on each single's weekly physical and digital sales, as well as airplay and streaming. At the end of a year, Billboard will publish an annual list of the 100 most successful songs throughout that year on the Hot 100 chart based on the information. For 2020, the list was published on December 3, calculated with data from  November 23, 2019 to November 14, 2020.

Billboards top Hot 100 artist of 2020 was The Weeknd, whose "Blinding Lights" was the number-one Hot 100 song of the year. It was one of two songs he placed on the list.

Year-end list

See also
 2020 in American music
 List of Billboard Hot 100 number ones of 2020
 List of Billboard Hot 100 top-ten singles in 2020

References

United States Hot 100 Year end
Billboard charts
2020 in American music